Jerzy "Jastrząb" Jastrzębowski (born 14 January 1951) is a Polish football manager. Jastrzębowski has spent the majority of his career managing teams in the Pomeranian area.

Managerial career

Jastrzębowski started his managerial career at the age of 30 managing the Lechia Gdańsk youth teams before taking the position as the manager of the first team. Despite Lechia being his first job, it has arguably been his most successful job. Despite Lechia being in the third tier, the team won the Puchar Polski and the subsequent SuperPuchar Polski in 1983, as well as winning their division. This led to Lechia playing in a European competition for the first time, while only being in the second tier. Lechia were drawn against Juventus and eventually lost 10-2 on aggregate. At the end of the season he again won the league with Lechia, and they were promoted to the Ekstraklasa. Jastrzębowski wasn't incharge of Lechia in the Ekstraklasa however as he left for Gryf Słupsk at the end of the season. After leaving Lechia Jastrzębowski has gone on to manage a further 15 teams, including Arka Gdynia, Bałtyk Gdynia, Polonia Gdańsk, and Lechia twice more, once being during the Lechia-Polonia merger.

Personal life

Jastrzębowski is commemorated by a star at the MOSiR Stadium in Gdańsk. The "Avenue of Stars" commemorates the efforts and success of former players and coaches.

Honours
Lechia Gdańsk
Puchar Polski (1): 1983
SuperPuchar Polski (1): 1983
III Liga (1): 1983
II Liga (1): 1984

References 

1951 births
Living people
Sportspeople from Gdańsk
Sportspeople from Pomeranian Voivodeship
Polish footballers
Lechia Gdańsk players
Association footballers not categorized by position
Polish football managers
Lechia Gdańsk managers
Pomezania Malbork managers
Jeziorak Iława managers
Arka Gdynia managers